The Pilot Island Light is a lighthouse located near Gills Rock, on Pilot Island at the east end of Death's Door passage, in Door County, Wisconsin.

The building's plant is similar to Pottawatomie Light, but is made of brick instead of stone.  Until 1910 it was called Port des Morts Island Light.  The original fog signal building was converted to a second assistant lighthouse keeper's residence in 1900.

History

Frequent and oppressive fog made the passage hazardous, as well as making it an extremely lonely and forbidding place to work. A fog bell signal was installed in 1862.  In 1864 it was replaced by a foghorn. In 1875 it was converted to a steam powered fog siren.  In 1880 a separate fog building was built for a "duplicate" fog siren.  This began a  steam whistle and new building in 1900 (which still exists near water's edge). Up to three families at a time lived together in the large building. In 1904, there came a realization that the whistles were "less than effective' and they were replaced by dual diaphones.  The horns made living there difficult; fertilized eggs would be destroyed by the sounds.

This island and nearby Plum Island are two of four Wisconsin properties turned over by the U.S. Coast Guard to the United States Bureau of Land Management (BLM). The BLM is working to find new qualified owners, who would be required to care for the properties. The Coast Guard and BLM require the new stewards to maintain the buildings. It is one of ten lighthouses in Door County.

It was listed in the National Register of Historic Places in 1972 as the Pilot Island Light, reference #83004279.

The lighthouse is owned by the United States Fish and Wildlife Service. The grounds, dwelling and tower are closed. It is currently "abandoned, overgrown, and overrun" by a large cormorant population.

References

Further reading

 Eckert, Jack, Life on Pilot Island in 1955. (Archived April 13, 2007)
 Havighurst, Walter (1943) The Long Ships Passing: The Story of the Great Lakes, Macmillan Publishers.
 Oleszewski, Wes, Great Lakes Lighthouses, American and Canadian: A Comprehensive Directory/Guide to Great Lakes Lighthouses, (Gwinn, Michigan: Avery Color Studios, Inc., 1998) .
Pepper, Terry, Seeing the light, Port des Morts Light Station: Pilot Island, Door Peninsula, Wisconsin, (Archived May 16, 2007)
 
 Robb, David, Recollections of Plum Island at Seeing the Light, (Archived December 25, 2007)
 Sapulski, Wayne S., (2001) Lighthouses of Lake Michigan: Past and Present (Paperback) (Fowlerville: Wilderness Adventure Books) ; .
 Wright, Larry and Wright, Patricia, Great Lakes Lighthouses Encyclopedia Hardback (Erin: Boston Mills Press, 2006) .

External links

NPS Inventory of Historic Light Stations - Wisconsin, Plum Island Rear Range Light, (Archived February 7, 2007

Lighthouses completed in 1858
Lighthouses in Door County, Wisconsin
Lighthouses on the National Register of Historic Places in Wisconsin
1858 establishments in Wisconsin
National Register of Historic Places in Door County, Wisconsin